The  is a mini MPV produced by Japanese automaker Toyota. It is a five-seater mini MPV based on the Vitz, and was introduced in October 2005 as the successor of the Yaris Verso/FunCargo. The name "Ractis" is derived from "Run", "Activity" and "Space".



First generation (XP100; 2005) 

The first generation Ractis was initially only sold in Japan, and was available at Toyopet Store dealerships. A minor change was released on December 20, 2007 with new headlights and tail lights. Sales in Hong Kong started from October 2009.

Second generation (XP120; 2010) 

The Ractis is produced at the Iwate plant by Kanto Auto Works. It is available in 1.3 L and 1.5 L engines with G, X and S grades in Japan. The introduction of the Verso-S marked the re-entry of Toyota into the European B-MPV segment.

When it hit the market, the Verso-S had the shortest overall length of any mini MPV in Europe. The Verso-S is available with a choice of two engines, a 1.3-litre petrol unit or a 1.4-litre D-4D turbo-diesel unit, both mated to a six-speed manual transmission.

The petrol derivative is also offered with an optional, Multidrive S CVT, which features a seven speed, sequential paddle shift mode. The diesel model delivers  and 113 g/km respectively.

Toyota UK discontinued the Verso-S in 2013. On June 30, 2016, Toyota confirmed that the Ractis reached the end of production for Japanese, Hong Kong and Macau markets, but the Verso-S continued to be produced for European markets until 2017. Sales of the Ractis in Japan ended on August 31, 2016. It was succeeded by the Toyota Tank/Roomy.

The five-seater variant of the facelifted XP170 Sienta, the Funbase, which was released on September 11, 2018, is also considered as the successor of the Ractis.

Subaru Trezia 
Subaru announced a rebadged OEM version of the Ractis for the Japanese market on November 29, 2010. The name "Trezia" derives from the English language word "treasure".

Engines available consisted of a 1.3-litre 1NR-FE and 1.5-litre 1NZ-FE, coupled with a CVT. Front-wheel drive is offered as the entry level layout for both engines, with all-wheel drive available as an upgrade on the 1.5-litre version. In January 2011, Subaru debuted an STI tuned "Trezia STI" at the Tokyo Auto Salon.

The Trezia is also sold in Europe in LHD form, but not in RHD markets such as the United Kingdom or Ireland.

References 

Ractis
Mini MPVs
Hatchbacks
All-wheel-drive vehicles
Front-wheel-drive vehicles
Cars introduced in 2005
2010s cars